The Northern Mariana Islands Republican Caucuses took place on March 15, 2016, also dubbed "Super Tuesday II." Caucus attendees sent 9 delegates to the Republican National Convention in Cleveland, Ohio on behalf of the Northern Mariana Islands.

Procedure 
The caucus selected 6 of the 9 delegates to attend the RNC along with six alternatives, all of whom were previously designated by a caucus subcommittee. Bo Palacios, National Committeeman, Vicky Villagomez, the National Committeewoman, and James Ada, the Chairman of the CNMI Republican Party comprised the other three delegates, all of whom were expected to vote for the winning candidate alongside the 6 chosen delegates. These delegates received an at-large designation and were bound for the first ballot at the RNC but free to vote individually in any successive ballots. In the chance that the chosen candidate withdrew prior to the RNC, the delegates decided which candidate to support as a group.

Polling 
Polling sites were spread between the islands of Saipan, Tinian, and Rota and the meetings were conducted between 6:30 and 8 p.m. on the evening of March 15. Participation in the caucus was limited to official CNMI Republican Party members with a valid photo ID or voter registration card.

Representation and endorsement 
Three candidates, Ben Carson, Jeb Bush, and Donald Trump sent representatives to present their respective platform, marking the second commonwealth Republican caucus in history to receive candidate representatives. Newly appointed Governor Ralph Torres publicly backed Donald Trump as he stated that "He is the only candidate that I believe would give the attention we need in the White House."

Results 
The results of the voting period were decisive, handing Donald Trump 72.82% of the vote at 343 votes and transferring all 9 delegates to his cause at the Republican National Convention. Rounding out the voting totals was Ted Cruz at 23.99%, or 113 votes, John Kasich with 10 votes, and Marco Rubio with 5 votes out of the 471 votes cast.

See also 
 2016 Republican Party presidential primaries
 2016 Republican Party presidential debates and forums
 Results of the 2016 Republican Party presidential primaries

References 

Northern Mariana

2016 Northern Mariana Islands elections
Northern Mariana Islands Republican caucuses